Jeffrey Shevalier (born March 14, 1974) is a Canadian former professional ice hockey left winger. He played 32 games in the National Hockey League with the Los Angeles Kings and Tampa Bay Lightning between 1995 and 1999. The rest of his career, which lasted from 1994 to 2003, was mainly spent in the minor leagues.

Biography
As a youth, Shevalier played in the 1988 Quebec International Pee-Wee Hockey Tournament with a minor ice hockey team from Erin, Ontario. He was drafted in the fifth round, 111th overall, in the 1992 NHL Entry Draft by the Los Angeles Kings. He played 32 games in the National Hockey League: 27 with the Kings and five with the Tampa Bay Lightning.

He currently sells real estate in Tempe, Arizona.

Career statistics

Regular season and playoffs

References

External links
 

1974 births
Living people
Canadian expatriate ice hockey players in the United States
Canadian ice hockey left wingers
Cincinnati Cyclones (IHL) players
Detroit Vipers players
Grand Rapids Griffins (IHL) players
Ice hockey people from Ontario
Idaho Steelheads (WCHL) players
Los Angeles Kings draft picks
Los Angeles Kings players
North Bay Centennials players
Phoenix Mustangs players
Phoenix Roadrunners (IHL) players
Quebec Citadelles players
Sportspeople from Mississauga
Springfield Falcons players
Tampa Bay Lightning players
Utah Grizzlies (IHL) players